The Thunderbolts is a team of comic book supervillains and superheroes, as published by Marvel Comics.

The roster of the team has changed a great deal over the years. This page consists of the list of members during the team's history.

Roster list
The codenames listed under Character are those used during the time the character was a member; under the notes section, super-villain codenames are listed if applicable. Many characters changed their codenames upon joining. Characters with multiple codenames during their membership have them listed in order of appearance, separated by a slash (/), and listed after their leader.

Thunderbolts I
The following are members of the original Thunderbolts:

 Citizen V / Baron Helmut Zemo (leader)
 Atlas / Goliath
 MACH-I / MACH-II / MACH-III / MACH-IV / MACH-V/ MACH-X / Beetle
 Meteorite / Moonstone
 Songbird / Screaming Mimi
 Techno / Fixer
 Jolt
 Hawkeye
 Charcoal
 Ogre
 Amazon / Man-Killer
 Blackheath / Plantman
 Cyclone (Pierre Fresson)
 Harrier / Cardinal
 Skein / Gypsy Moth
 Vantage
 Cobalt Man - This was a disguise of Tony Stark when he infiltrated their ranks.

Thunderbolts II
The following were members of second incarnation of the Thunderbolts:

 Atlas
 Songbird
 Blizzard (Donnie Gill)
 Photon
 Joystick
 Speed Demon
 Radioactive Man
 Nighthawk

Thunderbolts Army
During the "Civil War", apprehended villains were given a choice to either help the Thunderbolts or go to jail. The project occurred three weeks earlier with the threat of the Grandmaster and his Squadron Sinister. Some of them reformed and joined the Thunderbolts in the end, returned to a life of crime, or joined The Initiative. Here is a list of them:

 Ajaxis
 Aqueduct
 Batroc the Leaper
 Blacklash
 Bloodstrike
 The Beetles
 Gary Quinn
 Joaquim Robichaux
 Elizabeth Vaughn
 Boomerang
 Bullseye
 Bushmaster
 Death Adder
 Doctor Octopus
 Eel
 Green Goblin
 Iron Maiden
 Jack O'Lantern
 Jester
 Killer Shrike
 King Cobra
 Lady Deathstrike
 Machete
 Mongoose
 Overmind
 Ox II (Ronald Bloch)
 Porcupine (Roger Gocking)
 Primus
 Psionex
 Coronary
 Mathemanic
 Pretty Persuasions
 Quicksand
 Rattler
 Red Ronin
 Scarecrow
 Silk Fever
 Slyde
 Smiling Tiger
 Snake Marston
 Taskmaster
 Tatterdemalion
 Texas Twister
 Unicorn
 Venom (Mac Gargan)
 Vermin
 Whiplash
 Whirlwind
 U-Foes
 Ironclad
 Vector
 X-Ray
 Vapor
 Wrecking Crew
 Bulldozer
 Piledriver
 Thunderball
 Wrecker
 Zaran

Thunderbolts III
The following are members of the third incarnation of the Thunderbolts following the "Civil War" storyline:

 Green Goblin (leader)
 Moonstone
 Bullseye
 Penance
 Radioactive Man
 Songbird
 Swordsman (Andreas von Strucker)
 Venom

Thunderbolts IV
During the "Dark Reign" storyline, the following were members of this incarnation of the Thunderbolts that was overseen by H.A.M.M.E.R.:

 Ant-Man
 Black Widow - Revealed to be Natasha Romanoff in disguise.
 Paladin
 Ghost
 Headsman
 Mister X
 Scourge
 Grizzly

Thunderbolts V
During the "Heroic Age" storyline, the following members are members of this incarnation of the Thunderbolts:

 Luke Cage (leader)
 Fixer
 Moonstone
 MACH-V
 Songbird
 Ghost
 Crossbones
 Juggernaut
 Man-Thing
 Hyperion
 Satana
 Underbolts
 Boomerang
 Centurius
 Mister Hyde
 Shocker
 Troll
 Dark Avengers
 Barney Barton
 Ai Apaec
 June Covington
 Ragnarok

Thunderbolts VI
The following are members of this incarnation of the Thunderbolts:

 Red Hulk (leader)
 Deadpool
 Elektra
 Punisher
 Agent Venom
 Red Leader
 Mercy
 Ghost Rider

Thunderbolts VII
Following the "Avengers: Standoff!" storyline, the following are members of this incarnation of the Thunderbolts:

 Winter Soldier (leader)
 Fixer
 Atlas
 Moonstone
 MACH-X
 Kobik

Thunderbolts VIII
The following are members of this incarnation of the Thunderbolts that hunted Punisher:

 Citizen V / Baron Zemo (leader)
 Moonstone
 Ghost
 Fixer
 Radioactive Man
 Jigsaw - He posed as Paladin.

Thunderbolts IX
During the "King in Black" storyline, Mayor Wilson Fisk formed this incarnation of the Thunderbolts to help deal with the invasion from Knull

 Taskmaster (leader)
 Mister Fear (Larry Cranston)
 Batroc the Leaper
 Rhino
 Star (Ripley Ryan)
 Ampere - A villain with electrical gauntlets. Killed by Mister Fear for trying to leave the group.
 Snakehead - A villain in a snake mask. Devoured by a Symbiote Dragon.
 Figment
 Foolkiller
 Grizzly
 Man-Bull
 Mister Hyde

Thunderbolts X
During the "Devil's Reign" storyline, Mayor Wilson Fisk passed a law that forbids superhero activities and forms the Thunderbolts units to apprehend any superheroes who break the law. Assisted by agents sporting the thunder bolt icon on their armor, the following are members of this incarnation of the Thunderbolts:

 U.S. Agent (leader)
 Agony (Gemma Shin)
 Electro (Francine Frye)
 Rhino
 Doctor Octopus
 Taskmaster
 Whiplash (Anton Vanko)
 Kraven the Hunter - This version was formerly known as the "Last Son of Kraven".
 Coachwhip
 Puff Adder
 Abomination

Thunderbolts XI
This group assembles in the aftermath of the Devil's Reign storyline:

 Hawkeye (leader)
 Spectrum
 America Chavez
 Power Man
 Persuasion
 Gutsen Glory - A new character whose background is classified.
 Eegro the Unbreakable - A new character from Monster Isle who is said to have an ultimate attack which involves him growing to gigantic size.

Marvel Cinematic Universe
The following are members of the original Thunderbolts team in the Marvel Cinematic Universe:
 Thaddeus "Thunderbolt" Ross
 Valentina Allegra de Fontaine — Founder
 Winter Soldier (James "Bucky" Barnes) — Field leader
 Black Widow (Yelena Belova)
 Ghost (Ava Starr)
 Red Guardian (Alexei Shostakov)
 Taskmaster (Antonia Dreykov)
 U.S. Agent (John Walker)

References

Thunderbolts